Mark A. Pinsky (15 July 1940 – 8 December 2016) was Professor of Mathematics at Northwestern University.  His research areas included probability theory, mathematical analysis, Fourier Analysis and wavelets.  Pinsky earned his Ph.D at Massachusetts Institute of Technology (MIT).

His published works include 125 research papers and ten books, including several conference proceedings and textbooks. His 2002 book, Introduction to Fourier Analysis and Wavelets, has been translated into Spanish.

Biography 
Pinsky was at Northwestern beginning in 1968, following a two-year postdoctoral position at Stanford. He completed the Ph.D. at Massachusetts Institute of Technology in 1966, under the direction of Henry McKean and became Full Professor in 1976. He was married to the artist Joanna Pinsky since 1963; they have three children, Seth, Jonathan and Lea, and four grandchildren, Nathan, Jason, Justin and Jasper.

Academic memberships and services 
Pinsky was a member of the American Mathematical Society (AMS), a fellow of the Institute of Mathematical Statistics, Mathematical Association of America, and has provided services for Mathematical Sciences Research Institute (MSRI), most recently as Consulting Editor for the AMS. He served on the Executive Committee of MSRI for the period 1996–2000.

Pinsky was an invited speaker at the meeting to honor Stanley Zietz in Philadelphia at University of the Sciences in Philadelphia, on 20 March 2008.

Pinsky was a Fellow of the Institute of Mathematical Statistics and member of the Editorial Board of Journal of Theoretical Probability.

Mathematical works 
His early work was directed toward generalizations of the central limit theorem, known as random evolution, on which he wrote a monograph in 1991. At the same time he became interested in differential equations with noise, computing the Lyapunov exponents of various stochastic differential equations. His many interests include classical harmonic analysis and stochastic Riemannian geometry. The Pinsky phenomenon, a term coined by J.P. Kahane, has become a popular topic for research in harmonic analysis.

Pinsky was coordinator of the twenty-ninth Midwest Probability Colloquium, held at Northwestern University in October 2007.

In 2008, the Department of Mathematics at Northwestern University received a private donation from Mark and Joanna Pinsky to endow an annual lecture series.

Selected publications
 Introduction to Fourier Analysis and Wavelets (Brooks/Cole Series in Advanced Mathematics), 2002, 
 Fourier series of radial functions in several variables
 Pointwise Fourier inversion and related eigenfunction expansions
 Eigenfunction expansions with general boundary conditions
 Pointwise Fourier Inversion-A Wave Equation Approach
 A generalized Kolmogorov for the Hilbert transform

See list of publication with pdfs.

External links
Home page at Northwestern

References 

Northwestern University faculty
1940 births
2016 deaths
Stanford University staff
20th-century American mathematicians
Massachusetts Institute of Technology alumni
21st-century American mathematicians